The De Yoe Building is a historic Tudor Revival style commercial building in downtown Carmel-by-the-Sea, California. The building was designed and built by the master builder Michael J. Murphy. It was designated as an important commercial building in the city's Downtown Historic District Property Survey, and was recorded with the Department of Parks and Recreation on July 8, 2002. The building is now occupied by the American Art Gallery.

History

In 1924, Ray C. De Yoe, of the Carmel Realty Company hired master builder Michael J. Murphy to design and build the De Yoe Building on Dolores Street. It was the home of a group of shops, which included the Carmel Pine Cone office and the Carmelita Hat Shoppe, and was opposite of the Carmel Post Office. 

The two-story building has a steep pitched side-gabled composition roof, with a wood frame building with stuccoed walls and half-timbered diagonal boards on three cross gabled dormers for the upstairs story apartments. The building qualifies for inclusion in the downtown historic district property survey because of it is a significant example of Tudor Revival style applied to a commercial building in Carmel, and because it represents the style of builder M. J. Murphy, with its steep gabled roofs and exposed faux-wood beams, stuccoed walls and prominent chimneys.

In February 1925, announcements appeared in the Carmel Pine Cone about the Carmel Hat Shop and the Carmel Pine Cone moving to the new De Yoe building on Dolores Street. The Carmel Pine Cone stayed in the De Yoe building until the end of World War II. In 1927, Dane Dennyand Hazel Watrous established the Denny-Watrous art gallery. In 1931, they added a stage for theatrical performances, sponsored chamber-music recitals, which led to establishing the Carmel Bach Festival. Architects Richard Neutra and Rudolf Schindler lectured in the gallery on modern architecture during the 1930s. In the 1950s, the Studio Theatre was established with restaurant facilities added in 1962. A Western Union office, several galleries, antique shops, and restaurants have been tenants in the last 75 years.

References

External links

 Downtown Conservation District Historic Property Survey
 Carmel Realty Company

1924 establishments in California
Carmel-by-the-Sea, California
Buildings and structures in Monterey County, California